Cyperotundone is an organic ketone with the formula C15H22O. It is found in many essential oils including that of Cyperus articulatus and Cyperus rotundus.

References 

Sesquiterpenes
Tricyclic compounds
Ketones